Huddie William Ledbetter (January 20, 1888 – December 6, 1949), better known by the stage name Lead Belly, was an American folk and blues singer notable for his strong vocals, virtuosity on the twelve-string guitar, and the folk standards he introduced, including his renditions of "In the Pines", "Goodnight, Irene", "Midnight Special", "Cotton Fields", and "Boll Weevil".

Lead Belly usually played a twelve-string guitar, but he also played the piano, mandolin, harmonica, violin, and windjammer. In some of his recordings, he sang while clapping his hands or stomping his foot.

Lead Belly's songs covered a wide range of genres, including gospel music, blues, and folk music, as well as a number of topics, including women, liquor, prison life, racism, cowboys, work, sailors, cattle herding, and dancing. He also wrote songs about people in the news, such as Franklin D. Roosevelt, Adolf Hitler, Jean Harlow, Jack Johnson, the Scottsboro Boys and Howard Hughes. Lead Belly was posthumously inducted into the Rock and Roll Hall of Fame in 1988 and the Louisiana Music Hall of Fame in 2008.

Though many releases credit him as "Leadbelly", he wrote his name as "Lead Belly". This is the spelling on his tombstone, and is used by the Lead Belly Foundation.

Biography

Personal life 

The younger of two children, Lead Belly was born Huddie William Ledbetter to Sallie Brown and Wesley Ledbetter on a plantation near Mooringsport, Louisiana.  On his World War II draft registration card in 1942, he gave his birthplace as Freeport, Louisiana ("Shreveport"). There is uncertainty over his precise date and year of birth. The Lead Belly Foundation gives his birth date as January 20, 1889, his grave marker gives the year 1889, and his 1942 draft registration card states January 23, 1889.

These records were made by census takers, and ages and dates were defined in terms of the census date. The 1900 United States Census lists "Hudy Ledbetter" as 12 years old, born January 1888, and the 1910 and 1930 censuses also give his age as corresponding to a birth in 1888. The 1940 census lists his age as 51, with information supplied by wife Martha. The books Blues: A Regional Experience by Eagle and LeBlanc and Encyclopedia of Louisiana Musicians by Tomko give January 23, 1888, while the Encyclopedia of the Blues gives January 20, 1888.

His parents had cohabited for several years. They officially married on February 26, 1888, perhaps after his birth that year. When Huddie was five years old, the family settled in Bowie County, Texas.

By the 1910 census of Harrison County, Texas, "Hudy Ledbetter" was living next door to his parents in a separate household with his first wife, Aletha "Lethe" Henderson. Aletha is recorded as age 19 and married one year. Others say she was 15 when they married in 1908. Ledbetter received his first instrument in Texas, an accordion, from his uncle Terrell. By his early twenties, having fathered at least two children, Ledbetter left home to make his living as a guitarist and occasional laborer.

Music career 
By 1903, Huddie was already a "musicianer", a singer and guitarist of some note. He performed to Shreveport audiences in St. Paul's Bottoms, a notorious red-light district. He began to develop his own style of music after exposure to the various musical influences on Shreveport's Fannin Street, a row of saloons, brothels, and dance halls in the Bottoms. This area is now referred to as Ledbetter Heights.

Between 1915 and 1939, Ledbetter served several prison and jail terms in Louisiana for a variety of criminal charges. Thirty years after starting his music career, he was "discovered" in prison during a 1930s visit by folklorists John Lomax and his son Alan Lomax. They were recording varieties of local music in the South as a project to preserve traditional music for the Library of Congress. This was one of numerous cultural projects during the Great Depression.

Deeply impressed by Ledbetter's vibrant tenor and extensive repertoire, the Lomaxes recorded him in 1933 on portable aluminum disc recording equipment in a project for the Library of Congress. They returned with new and better equipment in July 1934, recording hundreds of his songs. While in prison, Lead Belly may have first heard the traditional prison song "Midnight Special"; his versions became famous. On August 1, Ledbetter was released after having served nearly all of his minimum sentence. The Lomaxes had taken a record and a petition seeking his release to Louisiana Governor Oscar K. Allen at his urgent request. It included his signature song, "Goodnight Irene".

A prison official later wrote to John Lomax denying that Ledbetter's singing had anything to do with his release from prison. (State prison records confirm he was eligible for this due to good behavior). But, both Ledbetter and the Lomaxes believed that the record they had taken to the governor had helped gain his release from prison.

Ledbetter returned to a state in the midst of the Great Depression, and jobs were scarce. In September, needing regular work to satisfy parole, he asked John Lomax to take him on as a paid driver. For three months, he assisted the 67-year-old in his folk song collecting around the South. Son Alan Lomax was ill and did not accompany his father on this trip.

In December 1934, Lead Belly participated in a "smoker" (group sing) at a Modern Language Association meeting at Bryn Mawr College in Pennsylvania, where the senior Lomax had a prior lecture engagement. He was written up in the press as a convict who had sung his way out of prison. On New Year's Day, 1935, the pair arrived in New York City, where Lomax was scheduled to meet with his publisher, Macmillan, about a new collection of folk songs. The newspapers were eager to write about the "singing convict". Time magazine made one of its first March of Time newsreels about him. Lead Belly attained fame—although not fortune.

On January 23–25, 1935, Lead Belly had the first of several recording sessions with American Record Corporation (ARC). These sessions, combined with two others on February 5 and March 25, yielded 53 takes. Of those recordings, only six were ever released during Lead Belly's lifetime. ARC decided to simultaneously release these songs on six different labels they owned: Banner, Melotone, Oriole, Perfect, Romeo, and Paramount. These recordings achieved little commercial success. Part of the reason for the poor sales may have been that ARC released only his blues songs rather than the folk songs for which he would later become better known. Lead Belly continued to struggle financially. Like many performers, what income he made during his career came from touring, not from record sales. In February 1935, he married his girlfriend, Martha Promise, who came North from Louisiana to join him.

During February Ledetter recorded his repertoire with Alan Lomax, who also recorded other African Americans. Lomax interviewed Ledbetter about his life for their forthcoming book, Negro Folk Songs As Sung by Lead Belly (1936). But his father, who had a management contract with Lead Belly, was not able to arrange concert dates. In March 1935, Lead Belly accompanied John Lomax on a previously scheduled two-week lecture tour of colleges and universities in the Northeast, culminating at Harvard.

At the end of the month, John Lomax decided he could no longer work with Lead Belly. He gave him and Martha enough money to return by bus to Louisiana. He also gave Martha the money her husband had earned during three months of performing, but in installments, on the pretext that Lead Belly would spend it all on drinking if he was given a lump sum. From Louisiana, Lead Belly successfully sued Lomax for both the full amount of his earnings and release from his management contract. The quarrel was bitter, with hard feelings on both sides. In the midst of the legal wrangling, Lead Belly wrote to Lomax proposing they team up again, but this did not happen. The book that the Lomaxes published about Lead Belly in the fall of 1936 proved a commercial failure.

In January 1936, Lead Belly returned to New York on his own, without John Lomax, in an attempted comeback. He performed twice a day at Harlem's Apollo Theater during the Easter season. He developed a live dramatic recreation of the March of Time newsreel (itself a recreation), which was about his prison encounter with John Lomax, when he was still wearing uniform stripes. By this time he was no longer associated with Lomax.

Life magazine ran a three-page article titled "Lead Belly: Bad Nigger Makes Good Minstrel" in its issue of April 19, 1937. It included a full-page, color (rare in those days) picture of him sitting on grain sacks playing his guitar and singing. Also included was a striking photograph of his wife Martha Promise (identified in the article as his manager). Other photos showed Lead Belly's hands playing the guitar (with the caption "these hands once killed a man"), Texas Governor Pat M. Neff, and the "ramshackle" Texas State Penitentiary. The article attributes both of his pardons to his singing his petitions to the governors, who were so moved that they pardoned him. The article closed by saying that Lead Belly "may well be on the brink of a new and prosperous period."

Lead Belly failed to stir the enthusiasm of Harlem audiences. Instead, he attained success playing at concerts and benefits for an audience of folk music aficionados. He developed his own style of singing and explaining his repertoire in the context of Southern black culture, having learned from his participation in Lomax's college lectures. He was especially successful with his repertoire of children's game songs (as a younger man in Louisiana he had sung regularly at children's birthday parties in the black community). Black novelist Richard Wright wrote about him as a heroic figure in the Daily Worker, of which Wright was the Harlem editor. The two men became personal friends. In contrast to Wright, who was then a communist, commentators described Lead Belly as apolitical. He was known to support Wendell Willkie, the centrist Republican candidate for president, for whom he wrote a campaign song. Lead Belly also wrote the song "The Bourgeois Blues", which has class-conscious  and anti-racist lyrics.

In 1939, Lead Belly was convicted and sentenced again to prison. Alan Lomax, then 24, took him under his wing and helped raise money for his legal expenses, dropping out of graduate school to do so. After gaining release, Lead Belly appeared as a regular on Lomax and Nicholas Ray's groundbreaking CBS radio show Back Where I Come From, broadcast nationwide.

He also performed in nightclubs with Josh White, becoming a fixture in New York City's surging folk music scene and befriending the likes of Sonny Terry, Brownie McGhee, Woody Guthrie, and Pete Seeger, all fellow performers on Back Where I Come From.

In 1940, Lead Belly recorded for RCA Victor, one of the biggest record companies at the time. These sessions in California were held on June 15 and 17, with the Golden Gate Quartet accompanying some songs. The recordings resulted in the album, The Midnight Special and Other Southern Prison Songs, being issued by Victor Records. The album included sheets with extensive notes and song texts prepared by Alan Lomax. According to Charles Wolfe and Kip Lornell, "it was one of the finest public presentations of Leadbelly's music: well recorded, well advertised, well documented. And the album justified its reputation as a landmark in African American folk music." Several of the recordings from these sessions were also issued as singles by Bluebird Records.

In 1941, Lead Belly was introduced to Moses "Moe" Asch by mutual friends. Asch owned a recording studio and small record label, which mainly released folk records for the local New York City market. He later founded Folkways Records. Between 1941 and 1944, Lead Belly released three albums under the Asch Recordings label. During the first half of the 1940s, Lead Belly also recorded for the Library of Congress.

In 1944 he went to California, where he recorded strong sessions for Capitol Records. He lodged with a studio guitar player on Merrywood Drive in Laurel Canyon. Later he returned to New York City. In 1949, Lead Belly had a regular radio show, Folk Songs of America, broadcast on station WNYC in New York, on Henrietta Yurchenco's show on Sunday nights. Later in the year he began his first European tour with a trip to France, but fell ill before its completion and was diagnosed with amyotrophic lateral sclerosis (ALS), or Lou Gehrig's disease (a motor neuron disease). Lead Belly was the first American country blues musician to achieve success in Europe. His final concert was at the University of Texas at Austin in a tribute to his former mentor, John Lomax, who had died the previous year. Martha also performed at that concert, singing spirituals with Lead Belly.

Lead Belly died later that year in New York City. He is honored with a statue across from the Caddo Parish Courthouse, in Shreveport.

Legal issues 

Lead Belly was imprisoned multiple times beginning in 1915, when he was convicted of carrying a pistol, and sentenced to time on the Harrison County chain gang. He later escaped and found work in nearby Bowie County under the assumed name of Walter Boyd.

In January 1918, he was imprisoned at the Imperial Farm (now Central Unit) in Sugar Land, Texas, after being convicted of killing a relative, Will Stafford, in a fight over a woman. During his second prison term, Lead Belly was stabbed in the neck by another inmate. (The wound resulted in a fearsome scar the musician covered with a bandana). Lead Belly nearly killed his attacker at the time with his own knife.

In 1925 he was pardoned and released after writing a song to Texas Governor Pat Morris Neff seeking his freedom, having served the minimum seven years of a 7-35 year sentence. He was credited with good behavior, which included entertaining the guards and fellow prisoners. He also appealed for mercy to Neff's known religious beliefs. It was a testament to his persuasive powers, as Neff had run for governor on a pledge not to issue pardons (most Southern judicial systems had no provision for approving parole from prison.). After meeting Lead Belly in 1924, Neff returned to the prison several times after he was incarcerated again. He brought guests to the prison on Sunday picnics to hear Ledbetter perform.

In 1930, Ledbetter was sentenced to Louisiana State Penitentiary (nicknamed "Angola") after a summary trial for attempted homicide for stabbing a man in a fight. In 1939, Lead Belly served his final jail term for assault after stabbing a man in a fight in Manhattan.

Nicknamed "Lead Belly" 

There are several conflicting stories about how Ledbetter acquired the nickname "Lead Belly", it probably happened while he was in prison. Some claim his fellow inmates called him "Lead Belly" as a play on his family name and his physical toughness. Others say he earned the name after being wounded in the stomach with buckshot. Another theory is that the name refers to his ability to drink moonshine, the homemade liquor that Southern farmers, black and white, made to supplement their incomes.

Blues singer Big Bill Broonzy thought it came from a supposed tendency to lie about as if "with a stomach weighted down by lead" in the shade when the chain gang was supposed to be working.

Technique 
Lead Belly styled himself "King of the Twelve-String Guitar", and despite his use of other instruments, such as the accordion, the most enduring image of Lead Belly as a performer is wielding his unusually large Stella twelve-string. This guitar had a slightly longer scale length than a standard guitar, increasing the tension on the instrument, which, given the added tension of the six extra strings, meant that a trapeze-style tailpiece was needed to help resist bridge lifting. It had slotted tuners and ladder bracing.

Lead Belly played with finger picks much of the time, using a thumb pick to provide walking bass lines described as "tricky" and "inventive", and occasionally to strum. This technique, combined with low tunings and heavy strings, gives many of his recordings a piano-like sound. Scholars have suggested much of his guitar playing was inspired equally by barrelhouse piano and the Mexican Bajo Sexto, a type of guitar that he encountered in Texas and Louisiana.

Lead Belly's tunings are debated by both modern and contemporary musicians and blues enthusiasts alike, but it seems to be a down-tuned variant of standard tuning. Footage of his chording is scarce, so trying to decode his chords is difficult. It is likely that he tuned his guitar strings relative to one another, so that the actual notes shifted as the strings wore. Such down-tuning was a common technique before the development of truss rods, and was intended to prevent the instrument's neck from warping. Lead Belly's playing style was popularized by Pete Seeger, who adopted the twelve-string guitar in the 1950s and released an instructional LP and book using Lead Belly as an exemplar of technique.

In some of the recordings in which Lead Belly accompanied himself, he made an unusual type of grunt between his verses, sometimes described as "haah!" Songs such as "Looky Looky Yonder", "Take This Hammer", "Linin' Track", and "Julie Ann Johnson" feature this unusual vocalization. In "Take This Hammer", Lead Belly explained, "Every time the men say, 'Haah,' the hammer falls. The hammer rings, and we swing, and we sing." The "haah" sound can also be heard in work chants sung by Southern railroad section workers, "gandy dancers", in which it was used to coordinate work crews as they laid and maintained tracks.

Legacy 

In 1976, a biopic titled Leadbelly was released, directed by Gordon Parks and featuring Roger E. Mosley as Lead Belly.

In 1951, the Weavers' recording of their arrangement of Lead Belly's "Irene," released as "Good Night, Irene," was the first folk song to reach #1 on the U.S. charts, selling some two million copies.

Kurt Cobain promoted the legacy of Lead Belly, and some modern rock audiences owe their familiarity with Lead Belly to Nirvana's performance of "Where Did You Sleep Last Night" (which Lead Belly called "In the Pines") on a televised concert later released as MTV Unplugged in New York. Cobain refers to his attempt to convince David Geffen to purchase Lead Belly's guitar for him in an interval before the song is played. In his notebooks, Cobain listed Lead Belly's Last Session Vol. 1  as one of the 50 albums most influential in the formation of Nirvana's sound. It was included in NME's "The 100 Greatest Albums You've Never Heard list".

Ram Jam, an American rock band, had a hit with the song "Black Betty" which they remade as a rock song in 1977. "Black Betty" was recorded by Lead Belly in 1939.

Bob Dylan credits Lead Belly for getting him into folk music. In his Nobel Prize Lecture, Dylan said "somebody – somebody I'd never seen before – handed me a Lead Belly record with the song 'Cotton Fields' on it. And that record changed my life right then and there. Transported me into a world I'd never known. It was like an explosion went off. Like I'd been walking in darkness and all of the sudden the darkness was illuminated. It was like somebody laid hands on me. I must have played that record a hundred times." Dylan also pays homage to him in "Song to Woody" on his self-titled debut album.

Lonnie Donegan's recording of "Rock Island Line", released as a single in late 1955, signaled the start of the UK skiffle craze. George Harrison of The Beatles was quoted as saying, "if there was no Lead Belly, there would have been no Lonnie Donegan; no Lonnie Donegan, no Beatles. Therefore no Lead Belly, no Beatles." In a BBC tribute in 1999, which marked the 50th anniversary of Lead Belly's death, Van Morrison – while sitting alongside Ronnie Wood of The Rolling Stones – claimed that the British popular music scene of the 1960s wouldn't have happened if it weren't for Lead Belly's influence. "I'd put my money on that," he said. Wood concurred.

Indian singer Bhupen Hazarika—who was, in general, influenced by spirituals during his days as a student in the US—transcreated Lead Belly's singing of "We're in the Same Boat Brother"  into the Assamese language as "Ami ekekhon nawore zatri" (আমি একেখন নাৱৰে যাত্ৰী). Later, he also released a Bengali language version as "Mora jatri eki toronir" (মোরা যাত্রী একই তরণীর).

In 2001 English-Canadian blues singer Long John Baldry released his final studio album, Remembering Leadbelly. It contains cover versions of Lead Belly songs, and features a six-minute Alan Lomax interview.

George Ezra developed his singing style from trying to sing like Lead Belly. "On the back of the record, it said his voice was so big, you had to turn your record player down," Ezra says. "I liked the idea of singing with a big voice, so I tried it, and I could."

In 2015, in celebration of Lead Belly's 125th birthday, several events were held. The Kennedy Center, in collaboration with the Grammy Museum held Lead Belly at 125: A Tribute to an American Songster, a musical event featuring Robert Plant, Alison Krauss, and Buddy Miller with Viktor Krauss as headliners and Dom Flemons as host, with special appearances by Lucinda Williams, Alvin Youngblood Hart, Billy Hector, Valerie June, Shannon McNally, Josh White Jr., and Dan Zanes, among others  Also in Washington, D.C., Bourgeois Town: Lead Belly in Washington DC by the Library of Congress was held where Todd Harvey interviewed Lead Belly family members about their relative, his contributions to American culture and world music and an overview of the significant Lead Belly materials in the center's archive  In London, England, the Royal Albert Hall held Lead Belly Fest, a musical event featuring Van Morrison, Eric Burdon, Jools Holland, Billy Bragg, Paul Jones, and more.

The Titanic 
Influenced by the sinking of the Titanic in April 1912, Ledbetter wrote the song "The Titanic", his first composition on the twelve-string guitar, which later became his signature instrument. Initially played when performing with Blind Lemon Jefferson (1893–1929) in and around Dallas, Texas, the song is about champion African-American boxer Jack Johnson's being denied passage on the Titanic. Johnson had in fact been denied passage on a ship for being black, but it was not the Titanic. Still, the song includes the lyric "Jack Johnson tried to get on board. The Captain, he says, 'I ain't haulin' no coal!' Fare thee, Titanic! Fare thee well!" Ledbetter later noted he had to leave out this passage when playing in front of white audiences.

Discography

Singles

Albums

Posthumous discography

The Library of Congress recordings 
The Library of Congress recordings, made by John and Alan Lomax from 1934 to 1943, were released in a six-volume series by Rounder Records:

 Midnight Special (1991)
 Gwine Dig a Hole to Put the Devil In (1991)
 Let It Shine on Me (1991)
 The Titanic (1994)
 Nobody Knows the Trouble I've Seen (1994)
 Go Down Old Hannah (1995)

Folkways recordings 
The Folkways recordings, done for Moses Asch from 1941 to 1947, were released in a three-volume series by Smithsonian Folkways:

 Where Did You Sleep Last Night, Lead Belly Legacy, Vol. 1 (1996)
 Bourgeois Blues, Lead Belly Legacy, Vol. 2 (1997)
 Shout On, Lead Belly Legacy, Vol. 3 (1998)

Smithsonian Folkways has released several other collections of his recordings:

 Leadbelly Sings Folk Songs (1989)
 Lead Belly's Last Sessions (4-CD box set, 1994), recorded late 1948 in New York City; his only commercial recordings on magnetic tape
 Lead Belly Sings for Children (1999)
 Folkways: The Original Vision, Woody Guthrie and Lead Belly (2004), expanded version of the 1989 compilation
 Lead Belly: The Smithsonian Folkways Collection (2015)

Live recordings 
 Leadbelly Recorded in Concert, University of Texas, Austin, June 15, 1949 (1973, Playboy Records PB 119)

Other compilations 
 Huddie Ledbetter's Best (1989, BGO Records), containing recordings made for Capitol Records in 1944 in California
 King of the 12-String Guitar (1991, Sony/Legacy Records), a collection of blues songs and prison ballads recorded in 1935 in New York City for the American Record Company, including previously unreleased alternate takes
 Private Party November 21, 1948 (2000, Document Records), containing Lead Belly's intimate performance at a private party in late 1948 in Minneapolis
 Take This Hammer, When the Sun Goes Down series, vol. 5 (2003, RCA Victor/Bluebird Jazz), CD collection of all 26 songs Lead Belly recorded for Victor Records in 1940, half of which feature the Golden Gate Jubilee Quartet (a 1968 LP released by RCA Victor included about half of these recordings)
 A Leadbelly Memorial, Vol II (1963, Stinson Records, SLP 19), red vinyl pressing
 The Definitive Lead Belly (2008, Not Now Music), a 50-song retrospective on two CDs
 Leadbelly – American Folk & Blues Anthology (2013, Not Now Music), 75 songs on three CDs
American Epic: The Best of Lead Belly (2017, Lo-Max, Sony Legacy, Third Man)

References

Sources 
 White, Gary; Stuart, David; Aviva, Elyn (2001). Music in Our World. p. 196. .
 Wolfe, Charles; Lornell, Kip (1992). The Life and Legend of Leadbelly . New York City: HarperCollins Publishers.

External links 

 The Lead Belly Foundation
 The Official Lead Belly Website
 "Ledbetter, Huddie (Leadbelly)" in the Handbook of Texas Online
 [ AllMusic]
 
 Discography for Lead Belly on Folkways
 Leadbelly and Lomax Together at the American Music Festival on WNYC
 Lead Belly And The Lomaxes: Myths and Realities A FAQ and Timeline Lead Belly's relationship with John and Alan Lomax
 Louisiana Music Hall of Fame Induction Page
 Lead Belly: Entries|KnowLA, Encyclopedia of Louisiana
 

1888 births
1949 deaths
American accordionists
American acoustic guitarists
American blues guitarists
American blues singers
American street performers
American folk guitarists
American male guitarists
American folk singers
American multi-instrumentalists
American people convicted of attempted murder
American people convicted of murder
American male criminals
Country blues musicians
Criminals from Louisiana
Criminals from Texas
Deaths from motor neuron disease
Neurological disease deaths in New York (state)
Musicians from Dallas
Singers from Louisiana
People from Mooringsport, Louisiana
Prison music
Songster musicians
Guitarists from Louisiana
Guitarists from Texas
20th-century American guitarists
20th-century accordionists
20th-century American criminals
Folkways Records artists
African-American guitarists
Prisoners and detainees of Texas
Prisoners and detainees of Louisiana
20th-century African-American male singers